Sa'id Ali Jabir Al Khathim Al Shihri (1971–2013) was a Saudi Arabian deputy leader of the terrorist group Al-Qaeda in the Arabian Peninsula (AQAP), and possibly involved in the kidnappings and murders of foreigners in Yemen. Said Ali al-Shihri was captured at the Durand Line, in December 2001, and was one of the first detainees held at the Guantanamo Bay detention camps, in Cuba, arriving on 21 January 2002. He was held in extrajudicial detention in American custody for almost six years.
Following his repatriation to Saudi custody he was enrolled in a rehabilitation and reintegration program. Following his release, he traveled to Yemen.

In January 2009, Al-Shihri appeared in a YouTube video, with three other men, announcing the founding of Al Qaeda in the Arabian Peninsula.

On 24 December 2009, it was reported that he may have been killed in an air strike in Yemen. But on 19 January 2010, Yemen security authorities reported they had captured him. On 22 February 2010, the Yemen Post reported that the release of an audio recording, after the reports of his death, or capture, confirmed he was at large. Yemen officials reported he was killed by a drone strike on 10 September 2012. Six days later, a Yemeni official told the London-based daily Asharq Al-Awsat that DNA tests reportedly determined he was not killed in the drone strike.

On 20 September 2012, sources close to AQAP told the Yemen Observer that al-Shihri was not killed in the strike. Yemeni officials also told the same newspaper that contrary to what Asharq Al-Aswat reported, no DNA tests had yet been taken and that the United States had requested that the Yemeni government wait until an American team of examiners could administer the DNA tests on the corpses of the men killed in the drone strike.

On 21 October 2012, al-Shihri released an audio tape confirming that he was not killed in the drone strike. On 22 January 2013, it was reported that al-Shihri had died of wounds from a drone strike in late 2012.

On 17 July 2013, Al Qaeda in the Arabian Peninsula confirmed that he had been killed in a U.S. drone strike instead of succumbing to wounds. In August 2014, the group revealed in a video that the drone strike that killed Shihri took place in 2013 and that he had survived the 2012 drone strike but was severely wounded.

Early life
The Yemen Post reports al Shihri did not finish high school. According to the United States Department of Defense, al-Shihri spent two months in Afghanistan in approximately 2000, and trained at the Libyan training camp north of Kabul.

Al-Shihri said that he was in Afghanistan to purchase carpets for his family's furniture business. He denied any knowledge of weapons or participation in hostilities.

In 2001, al-Shiri left Saudi Arabia and went to Bahrain. He was on a watch list because he was suspected of funding other fighters' travels to Afghanistan after 9-11. He was also accused of helping Saudis acquire false travel documents to enter into Afghanistan. Specifically he was accused of meeting with "a group of extremists in Mashad, Iran", and briefing them on entry procedures into Afghanistan via the Al-Tayyibat crossing.

Capture
Al-Shihri was captured at the Pakistan border crossing in December 2001 near Spin Boldak. He was traveling with an Afghan driver, another Saudi man who worked with the Red Crescent, and a member from the Saudi embassy in Pakistan, in a vehicle taking supplies to a camp in Afghanistan. He was found with an injured leg incurred during the American aerial bombardment of Afghanistan. He was also allegedly carrying $1,900.

He claimed he wanted to give the money to the Red Crescent charity organization, but according to the US, he used the money to finance the travel for other fighters traveling from Bahrain to Afghanistan.

Combatant Status Review

Initially the Bush administration asserted they could withhold the protections of the Geneva Conventions from captives in the War on Terror, while critics argued the Conventions obliged the United States to conduct competent tribunals to determine the status of prisoners. Subsequently the Department of Defense instituted Combatant Status Review Tribunals, to determine whether the captives met the new definition of an "enemy combatant".

Detainees do not have the right to a lawyer before the CSRTs or to access the evidence against them.  The CSRTs are not bound by the rules of evidence that would apply in court, and the government’s evidence is presumed to be “genuine and accurate.”  However, unclassified summaries of relevant evidence may be provided to the detainee and each detainee has an opportunity to present “reasonably available” evidence and witnesses.

From July 2004 through March 2005, a CSRT was convened to make a determination whether each captive had been correctly classified as an "enemy combatant".  was among the one-third of prisoners for whom there was no indication they chose to participate in their tribunals.

In the landmark case Boumediene v. Bush, the U.S. Supreme Court found that CSRTs are not an adequate substitute for the constitutional right to challenge one's detention in court, in part because they do not have the power to order detainees released.  The Court also found that "there is considerable risk of error in the tribunal’s findings of fact." 

A Summary of Evidence memo was prepared for the tribunal, listing the alleged facts that led to his detainment. His memo accused him of the following:
he traveled from Saudi Arabia to Afghanistan, after 11 September 2001, with $1,900, that he planned to give to the Red Crescent charity;
he was an "al Qaida travel facilitator", who funded other fighters, and guided them on how to cross the Afghanistan–Iran border;
he was on a watch list because he was suspected of helping Saudis acquire false travel documents, for traveling to Afghanistan;
he trained at the Libyan camp north of Kabul;
he was instructed to assassinate someone, via a fatwa;
his leg was wounded during the American aerial bombardment of Afghanistan.

Administrative Review Board 
Detainees whose Combatant Status Review Tribunal labeled them "enemy combatants" were scheduled for annual Administrative Review Board hearings.  These hearings were designed to assess the threat a detainee might pose if released or transferred, and whether there were other factors that warranted his continued detention.

2005 Summary of evidence memo
The three-page Summary of Evidence memo prepared for his 2005 annual review listed fifteen "primary factors favor[ing] continued detention" and eight "primary factors favor[ing] release or transfer." According to the 2005 memo he did not enter Afghanistan across its western border with Iran but across its eastern border with Pakistan. According to the 2005 memo the instructions he received to assassinate someone were from Sheikh Hamud Al-Uqqla. According to the 2005 memo he met Abu Faisal al Ghamdi, the Herat regional director for the charity al Wafa which American intelligence officials assert had ties to terrorism, and another al Wafa director had his phone number in his pocket litter. The 2005 memo repeated al-Shihri's account of his travel and wounding in Afghanistan—that he traveled there for humanitarian purposes, and was wounded within 17 hours of his arrival. He claimed he had never heard of either al Wafa or al Qaida prior to his arrival in Guantanamo. He denied any knowledge of weapons or participation in hostilities, or any participation in assisting militant recruits to travel to Afghanistan. He stated that Osama bin Laden "did not represent Islam".

2006 Summary of Evidence memo
The four page Summary of Evidence memo prepared for his 2006 annual review listed twenty-two "primary factors favor[ing] continued detention" and nine "primary factors favor[ing] release or transfer". According to the 2006 memo, he decided to do charity work in Pakistan after he heard a speech by Shaykh Abdullah al-Jibrin at the Al-Rajeh mosque in Saudi Arabia and saw videos of Afghan refugees. According to the 2006 memo, he had previously traveled to the Pakistan border with Afghanistan to observe the work in a refugee camp near Chaman, Pakistan. The 2006 memo was more specific about his assistance to potential fighters, stating: "The detainee met with a group of extremists in Mashad, Iran following the 11 September 2001 attacks and briefed them on entry procedures into Afghanistan via the Al-Tayyibat crossing."

The 2006 memo was also more specific about where he crossed—near Spin Buldak: "The detainee traveled with an Afghan driver, another Saudi man who worked with the Red Crescent, and a member from the Saudi embassy in Pakistan, in a vehicle taking supplies to a camp in Afghanistan." The camp was about 5 kilometers from the border between Spin Buldak Afghanistan and Quetta, Pakistan. The 2006 memo stated one of his aliases: "was among 100 names taken from Afghanistan-based military training cmap applications located at an Arab office in Kandahar". The 2006 memo quoted the individual who claimed Al Shihri had "instigated" him to assassinate a writer, based on Al-Uqqla's fatwa. According to this version, Al Shihri was not wounded; he had successfully fled Afghanistan, through Iran, to Kuwait. The 2006 memo also stated he was taken to a hospital run by the Red Crescent society in Pakistan, and that he was arrested in the hospital.

2007 Summary of evidence memo

The three-page Summary of Evidence memo prepared for his 2007 annual review listed just eleven "primary factors favor[ing] continued detention" and six "primary factors favor[ing] release or transfer".
No new allegations were added. On 9 January 2009, the Department of Defense published two heavily redacted memos, from Al-Shihri's Board, to Gordon R. England, the Designated Civilian Official.
The Board's recommendation was unanimous
The Board's recommendation was redacted.
England decision, made on 23 July 2007, was also redacted.

Guantanamo medical records
On 16 March 2007, the Department of Defense published records of the captives' height and weights. Al Shihri's height was reported as 62 inches tall. His weight was recorded 46 times between his arrival on 21 January 2002, when he weighed 138 pounds, and 19 November 2006, when he weighed 171 pounds.

Repatriation
On 25 November 2008, the Department of Defense released a list of the dates captives departed from Guantanamo.
According to that list he was repatriated to Saudi custody on 9 November 2007, with thirteen other men.
The records published from the captives' annual Administrative Reviews show his repatriation was the subject of formal internal review procedures in 2005, 2006 and 2007.
But the Board's recommendations from the 2007 review—the only one to be published—were redacted.
The conclusion the Designated Civilian Official authorized was also redacted.

At least ten other men in his release group were not repatriated through the formal review procedure.

Peter Taylor writing for the BBC News called the Saudis repatriated on 9 November 2007 with al-Shihri, "batch 10".
He wrote that the BBC's research had found this batch to be a problematic cohort, and that al Shiri and four other men from this batch were named on the Saudi most wanted list.

Post-release
After Sa'id's repatriation to Saudi custody he went through a Saudi rehabilitation and reintegration program for former jihadists. This program was partially sponsored by the United States.

Co-founded Al Qaeda in the Arabian Peninsula
In January 2009, after Sa'id's release from the Saudi rehabilitation program he appeared in several jihadist videos, including one where he was identified as second in command of Al-Qaida in the Arabian Peninsula.
He appeared in a threatening YouTube video with three other men, identified as Abu Hareth Muhammad al-Oufi, Abu Baseer al-Wahayshi and Abu Hureira Qasm al-Rimi.

The New York Times, quoting American diplomats in Sana, reported that a car bomb that detonated outside their Embassy in Sana was the work of Al-Shihri.

On 26 January 2009, the Saudi Gazette published a report based on interviews with Al Shihri's father, and current wife.
Jaber Aal Khath'am Al-Shihri said his son had spent Ramadan with his family.
The elder Al Shihri said his son was a primary-school dropout, that he had been married twice, and had a young daughter.
He said that his son had been troubled by memories of his detention, where his son told him "he thought about death all the time."
He said that, after his release, his son had hoped to find a job as an imam.
He said that he had added an addition to his family home for his son and his family to live in.
However, after Ramadan, his son left his pregnant wife and child with his in-laws, and disappeared.

The Saudi Gazette reported that his wife confirmed his father's account.
She told the Gazette he had been acting normally, prior to his disappearance. "He used to smile and laugh and was generally happy."
She described the 3000 Saudi Riyal monthly stipend he received from the Saudi government, following his release, as "an honor."

She told the paper that her husband's sister had phoned her, after his disappearance, and told her he had requested she get a cell phone, so he could talk to her, but then he had not phoned.

The Saudi Gazette reported that one of al-Shihri's brothers-in-law, Yusuf Al-Shihri, was also a former Guantanamo captive.

While al-Shihri's wife had told the Saudi Gazette she suspected nothing, his father said visits from other former captives disturbed him, and he attributed his son's defection to their influence. He said that he regretted his son had not died from the wounds he suffered in Afghanistan.

Muhammad al-Oufi's mother told the Saudi Gazette that her son's radicalization was due to Sa'id's influence.

Called upon Somali pirates to "increase your attacks upon Crusaders"
On 16 April 2009, CBS News reported on a message Al Shihri issued to Somali pirates.

CBS reported that there had been little concrete sign of a collaboration between Al Qaeda and the Somali pirates, but that the message also promised Osama bin Laden, Ayman Al Zawahiri and Mullah Omar that al-Shihri's group would be opening a new front in the Arabian Peninsula.

Listed as a former captive who "re-engaged in terrorism"
On 27 May 2009, the Defense Intelligence Agency published a "fact sheet" listing captives who "re-engaged in terrorism".
The fact sheet listed al Awfi and Al Shihri.

Linked to the murder of Christian missionaries in Yemen
Fox News quoting Robert Spencer of Jihad Watch, linked Said Ali Al Shihri to the kidnapping and murder of Christian missionaries Rita Stumpp, Anita Gruenwald Eom Young-sun, and the kidnapping of six other Christian medical missionaries.

Fox News also quoted Gregory Johnsen, editor of "Islam and Insurgency in Yemen":

While Fox News acknowledged no group had taken responsibility for the murders it speculated that the possible involvement of al-Shihri, a graduate of the Saudi jihadist rehabilitation program, would complicate United States President Barack Obama's plans to close Guantanamo.

Released a video requesting donations
On 30 September 2009, the Middle East Media Resources Institute reported that Said Al Shiri had released a video requesting donations.
Said's father, and Prince Muhammad Bin Naif, Assistant Deputy Interior Minister for Security Affairs, spoke out against his funding efforts.

Reported killed in an air strike
On 24 December 2009, ABC News reported that an air strike in Yemen had killed senior members of al Qaida.
They reported that the dead might include Nasir al-Wuhayshi, al-Shihri, and Anwar al-Awlaki.

Reported to be in Yemeni custody
On 19 January 2010, Yemen security authorities reported they had captured al-Shiri. He was reported to have tried to evade a newly established roadblock, and to have been apprehended, with another man, after they were injured when their speeding vehicle flipped over.

Release of an audio recording in February 2010
The Yemen Post reported that al Shihri released an audio recording made after the reports of his death and capture.
They speculated that the audio tape indicated that the reports that the leader of Al Qaeda in the Arabian Peninsula, Nasser al Wahayshi, was killed on 24 December 2009 attack.
Al Shihri's audio took credit for Nigerian Umar Umar Farouk Abdulmutalib's attempted airliner bombing.
He threatened that the group had scheduled operation to "control Bab Al-Mandab strait".
The Yemen Post also reported that al Shihri claimed the USA was planning to insert US troops into Yemen to directly attack his group.

The arrest of 100 suspect followers announced in March 2010
On 25 March 2010, Saudi officials announced that they had arrested 100 suspected followers of Al Qaida in the Arabian Peninsula.
Judith Miller, formerly of The New York Times, reporting for Fox News, wrote that the captured men were reported to be "exchanging coded e-mails", with al-Shiri.

Named in a custody dispute
In August 2009, the first husband of al-Shihri's wife Umm Hajir Al-Azdi, named Saoud Aal Shaye' al-Qahtani, launched a child custody claim, noting that his former wife was a believer in the practice of takfir (declaring others apostates from Islam), and had taken their 11-year-old son to Yemen with al-Shihri in May 2009. al-Qahtani provided evidence of her inability to raise his son, noting that she was married to al-Shihri, her younger brother had also been imprisoned at Guantanamo, three of her brothers were allegedly "militant jihadists", and her second husband had been killed by Saudi security forces in 2004.

Reports of death
On 22 January 2013, members of al-Shihri's family told Al Arabiya that he had died earlier that day after succumbing to wounds from a previous airstrike. An Al Qaeda spokesman identified as Abdulla bin Muhammad stated on his Twitter account that al-Shihri died "after a long journey in fighting the Zio-Crusader campaign." It was not known exactly how he died and under what circumstances, though his family alleged the drone strike took place sometime in the second week of December 2012. On 9 April, Al-Qaeda in the Arabian Peninsula's media arm Al-Malahem Foundation released an audio message of al-Shihri, accompanied by a previously unreleased photo, and an Al Qaeda cleric identified as Abu-Saad Al-Aamly denied reports of al-Shihri's death.

Death
On 17 July 2013, Al Qaeda in the Arabian Peninsula confirmed that al-Shihri was killed in a U.S. drone strike. The announcement, posted on militant websites, gave no date for the death. In August 2014, the group revealed that al-Shihri was killed in 2013 and had survived the 2012 drone strike, but lost his right eye, right ear and a part of his skull.

References

1971 births
2013 deaths
Al-Qaeda propagandists
Deaths by United States drone strikes in Yemen
Detainees of the Guantanamo Bay detention camp
Guantanamo detainees known to have been released
Fugitives
Individuals designated as terrorists by the United States government
Named on Saudi Arabia's list of most wanted suspected terrorists
Saudi Arabian al-Qaeda members
Saudi Arabian expatriates in Pakistan
Saudi Arabian extrajudicial prisoners of the United States
Saudi Arabian propagandists